Anderson v. Liberty Lobby, Inc., 477 U.S. 242 (1986), is a United States Supreme Court case articulating the standard for a trial court to grant summary judgment. Summary judgment will lie when, taking all factual inferences in the non-movant's favor, there exists no genuine issue as to a material fact and the movant deserves judgment as a matter of law. Because courts almost always cite Liberty Lobby in their opinions for the standard regarding motions for summary judgment, Liberty Lobby is the most cited Supreme Court case.

Background
The Investigator, an investigative news magazine, published three articles about the Liberty Lobby, calling the organization and its founder Willis Carto antisemitic, racist and Fascist. Liberty Lobby and Carto sued Investigator Publishing and its publisher, journalist Jack Anderson for libel. The defendants moved for summary judgment under the standard set by New York Times Co. v. Sullivan, which requires a plaintiff to prove with clear and convincing evidence that a defamatory statement was made with actual malice. The District Court ruled that The Investigator had duly researched its statements and granted the motion. Summary judgment was reversed on appeal with respect to some of the alleged defamatory statements, with the Court of Appeals stating that evidence need not be clear and convincing for the purpose of summary judgment.

A majority of the Supreme Court held that when a "clear and convincing" standard applies, it applies as well to summary judgment. It vacated the Court of Appeals' ruling and remanded the case for further proceedings. Justices Rehnquist, Burger and (separately) Brennan dissented on the grounds that the Court's reasoning was too abstract to provide the necessary guidance to lower courts.

See also
Celotex Corp. v. Catrett (1986), another major case on summary judgment under the Federal Rules of Civil Procedure

References

External links 

United States Supreme Court cases
United States summary judgment case law
1986 in United States case law
United States Supreme Court cases of the Burger Court